Heartland Payment Systems, Inc. is a U.S.-based payment processing and technology provider. Founded in 1997, Heartland Payment Systems' last headquarters were in Princeton, New Jersey. An acquisition by Global Payments, expected to be worth $3.8 billion or $4.3 billion. was finalized on April 25, 2016.

Heartland Payment Systems provides payment processing for more than 275,000 business locations in the United States and processes more than 11 million transactions a day and more than $80 billion in transactions a year, as of 2014. In 2014, the Nilson Report ranked Heartland the 6th largest payment processor in the country by transaction count, and the 8th largest by processed dollar volume.

Associated businesses
In addition to payment processing, Heartland has developed or acquired businesses in payroll processing, gift card and campus card, point of sale systems, school payments and nutrition, network management, mobile payments and ordering, eCommerce, billing, and lending services.

History
Heartland processed its first card transaction on July 15, 1997. In 2001 the company received a $40 million private equity investment from Greenhill Capital Partners, L.P. (New York, NY), LLR Partners, Inc. (Philadelphia, PA), and their affiliated investment funds.  The company went public on the New York Stock Exchange on August 11, 2005. On May 17, 2010, Heartland announced its debut on the list of America’s largest companies at #954.

Security breach

On January 20, 2009 Heartland announced that it had been "the victim of a security breach within its processing system in 2008". The data stolen included the digital information encoded onto the magnetic stripe built into the backs of credit and debit cards; with that data, thieves can fashion counterfeit credit cards by imprinting the same stolen information onto fabricated cards. One estimate claimed 100 million cards and more than 650 financial services companies were compromised; at the time, it was characterized as the largest ever criminal breach of card data.

An American computer hacker, Albert Gonzalez, was sentenced in March 2010 to 20 years in prison for his role in the hacking ring that broke into the Heartland computer systems. In February 2018, two Russian hackers were sentenced for a string of hacking including the Heartland breach.

On May 1, 2009, Visa and Heartland issued a statement that Heartland successfully validated its compliance with PCI DSS and was returned to Visa's list of PCI DSS Validated Service Providers.

End-to-end encryption
On May 24, 2009, Heartland commercially launched their E3, an end-to-end encryption technology designed to safeguard credit and debit card account information from the moment of card swipe and through the Heartland network. Gartner Analyst Avivah Litan stated that Heartland "is basically leading the way for the rest of the industry." She also characterized its plan for end-to-end encryption as the first effort of its kind in the US.

Other processors including Worldpay US and several First Data ISO's announced end-to-end encryption initiatives soon after Heartland announced theirs.

Open letter to the electronic payments industry 
Following a keynote address to the Strategic Leadership Forum of the Electronic Transactions Association in October 2013, Heartland CEO Bob Carr published an open letter to the electronic payment processing industry urging an end to unethical, dishonest and illegal pricing practices, referencing the practice of deliberately falsifying interchange rates, deliberately falsifying merchant category codes (MCC), and the use of confusing small print to extort large fines from merchants.

Litigation against Mercury Payment Systems 
In January 2014, Heartland filed a lawsuit against the company Mercury Payment Systems, an electronic payment provider, for alleged false advertising and "other deceptive trade practices".  The lawsuit concerns interchange fees charged by credit card networks and alleges violations of the Lanham Act and state laws.

Heartland Secure
In May 2014, Heartland Secure is launched. Backed by a breach warranty, Heartland Secure combines three technologies to provide merchants with security and guard against monetization of stolen card data.

Merger with Global Payments 
In April 2016, Heartland and Global Payments completed their merger agreement.  The combined company, Global Payments Inc., is publicly traded (NYSE: GPN), and has more than 8,500 employees worldwide.

Acquisitions
May 30, 2008 – Heartland completed acquisition of Alliance Data Systems, a provider of payment processing, serving a variety of industries such as petroleum, convenience store, parking and retail.
November 18, 2008 – Heartland acquired Chockstone, a privately held provider of gift card programs and loyalty Heartland Payment Systems.
January 1, 2011 – Heartland School Solutions acquired School Food Service Software Suite LunchBox from Data Futures, INC., a privately held provider of comprehensive K-12 school nutrition and point-of-sale (POS).
October 11, 2011 – Heartland School Solutions acquired School-Link Technologies, Inc., a privately held provider of comprehensive K-12 school nutrition and point-of-sale (POS) solutions.
July 9, 2012 – Heartland acquired LunchByte Systems, Inc., a school foodservice back office management and point-of-sale (POS) company led by its NUTRIKIDS menu management, inventory management and POS for K-12 administrators, staff, parents and students.
December 17, 2012 – Heartland expanded its Campus Solutions division by acquiring Educational Computer Systems, Inc. (ECSI), a provider of customized payment processing for the higher education industry.
January 7, 2013 – Heartland expanded its Payroll Services business by acquiring Ovation Payroll, a U.S. payroll outsourcing company that offers payroll tax preparation and administration, internet payroll reporting, direct deposit, and other services.
February 15, 2014, Heartland acquired Merchant Software Corp. (Liquor POS), a provider of POS systems to the liquor retail vertical.
April 10, 2014 – Heartland acquired MCS Software, a provider of school foodservice point-of-sale (POS), back office and online payment for more than 4,000 K-12 schools nationwide.
August 14, 2014 – Heartland announced the acquisition of Leaf, creator of a mobile Point-of-Sale (POS) tablet designed for commerce.
September 4, 2014 – Heartland acquired TouchNet Information Systems, Inc., an integrated commerce provider to higher-education institutions.
November 1, 2014 – Heartland announced it acquired XPIENT Solutions, an enterprise-level restaurant POS software service.
February 13, 2015 – Heartland acquired Dinerware and PC America, both point of sale systems specializing in the restaurant and retail space.
March 1, 2015 – Heartland acquired Payroll 1, a provider of payroll and tax filing products and services for employers in diverse industries throughout the United States 
October 30, 2015 – Heartland acquired Digital Dining, a point of sale system specializing in the restaurant space .

References

External links

Companies formerly listed on the New York Stock Exchange
American companies established in 1997
Online payments
Companies based in Princeton, New Jersey
2005 initial public offerings
2016 mergers and acquisitions
Payment service providers